Paul Campion may refer to:

 Paul Campion (radio host) (born 1969), Australian radio host
 Paul Campion (French Navy officer), French admiral
 Paul Campion (film director) (born 1967), English/New Zealand film director